is a village located in Yoshino District, Nara Prefecture, Japan.

As of October 2016, the village has an estimated population of 855 and a density of 6.4 persons per km². The total area is 133.53 km².

Bordering on Kamikitayama to the north and Totsukawa to the west, it is the southeasternmost region in Nara Prefecture. It shares a border to the east with Kumano, Mie Prefecture, and to the south, with Kitayama, Wakayama Prefecture.

Geography
Shimokitayama is composed of seven main hamlets, arranged roughly in a circle, and Zenki, which is no longer inhabited but which once housed a religious community of shugendo practitioners, including Jitsukaga.

Roads lead north toward Nara from Ikehara, east toward Kumano from Shimokuwahara, south toward Kitayama from Kamikuwahara, and west toward Totsukawa from Uramukai.

Ikehara
The main center of Shimokitayama's main industry, tourism, Ikehara is home to Kinari no Sato, a resort containing an onsen known as Kinari no Yu, various fishing and camping shops, gas stations, a few cafes and izakaya, and a small karaoke bar. It also contains Fumonji, a temple of the Sōtō sect of Zen Buddhism, and Shimokitayama Junior High School.
Ikemine
Ikemine is home to the Ike no Taira nine-hole golf course, the Myōjin Ike Pond Shrine and a Tenrikyō temple.
Teragaito
Teragaito contains Shimokitayama's village hall, Sumiyoshi Shrine, and Shimokitayama Elementary School. It is also home to Shōbōji, a temple of the Sōtō sect of Zen Buddhism at which local shugenja Jitsukaga Gyōja is enshrined.

Uramukai
Uramukai includes the drainage area known as Okuji, a series of waterfalls and mountain streams sacred to shugenja, who keep a hut high in the mountains for training purposes.
Sada
Sada is home to a gas station and a Tenrikyō temple.
Kamikuwahara
Kamikuwahara is almost entirely residential.
Shimokuwahara
Shimokuwahara contains Shimokitayama Preschool and Ryūganji a temple of the Sōtō sect of Zen Buddhism.
Zenki
Zenki is a wild and mountainous region which contains several large waterfalls sacred to shugenja, including the famous Nana E no Taki.

External links

 Shimokitayama official website 
 Japan】NARA Zenki Shimokitayama(English sub)

Villages in Nara Prefecture